Kod Tangan Bahasa Malaysia (KTBM), or Manually Coded Malay, is a signed form of the Malay language recognized by the government in Malaysia and the Malaysian Ministry of Education. It is used as an aid to teachers teaching the Malay language to deaf students in formal education settings. It is not itself a language, but a manually coded  form of Malay. It was adapted from American Sign Language (or perhaps Manually Coded English), with the addition of some local signs, plus grammatical signs to represent Malay affixation of nouns and verbs. It is used in Deaf schools for the purpose of teaching the Malay language.

The official Malaysian Sign Language, known as Bahasa Isyarat Malaysia, is the official sign language recognised by the Malaysian government to communicate with the deaf community, including on official broadcasts. It is a language in its own right and not a manual coding of the Malay language like KTBM.

Malay language
Malay